Maxine Bliss Jennings (March 8, 1909 – January 11, 1991) was an American actress.

Early years
Jennings was born and raised in Portland, Oregon, the daughter of Dr. and Mrs. Phillip Bliss Jennings. During her time as a student at the University of Oregon, she won eight swimming championships. On July 31, 1926, at age 17, Jennings won the Miss Portland beauty pageant, which entitled her to participate in the Miss America contest.

Career
In Paris, Jennings was a model for women's clothing designed by Jean Patou.  During her modeling years, she was featured on magazine covers. She also sang on radio and was the original Old Gold Girl. On stage, Jennings appeared in Show Boat, Earl Carroll's Vanities, and Ziegfeld Follies.

Her film debut came in a bit role in Girl Crazy. Her other films included Chatterbox (1936), Second Wife (1936) Walking on Air (1936) and You Can't Buy Luck (1937).

Personal life
On September 26, 1936, Jennings married animated cartoon film producer Rudolph Ising in Las Vegas, Nevada. She and radio producer Ed Byron were married on May 17, 1940. She married Philip Leverett Saltonstall on February 23, 1946. They had one daughter and were divorced in 1947.

Death
Jennings died on January 11, 1991, in Riverside, California.

Selected filmography 

 Roberta (1935)
 Old Man Rhythm (1935)
 Walking on Air (1936)
 The Witness Chair (1936)
 The Last Outlaw (1936)
 The Farmer in the Dell (1936)
 Muss 'em Up (1936)
 Make Way for a Lady (1936)
 Follow the Fleet (1936)
 Don't Turn 'em Loose (1936)
You Can't Buy Luck (1937)
We're on the Jury (1937)
There Goes My Girl (1937)
The Big Shot (1937)
On Again-Off Again (1937)
Mr. Wong, Detective (1938)
G.I. War Brides (1946)
Source: AllMovie

References

External links

1908 births
1991 deaths
20th-century American actresses
Actresses from Portland, Oregon
American film actresses
Year of birth uncertain
University of Oregon alumni
Ziegfeld girls